Black Panther is a beat 'em up arcade video game released by Konami in 1987. The player controls a cybernetic black panther cat who has to save the Earth by clawing, jumping, and shooting at enemies, collecting power-ups, and defeating bosses to advance levels.

Gameplay

References

1987 video games
Arcade video games
Arcade-only video games
Konami beat 'em ups
Video games about cats
Konami arcade games
Video games developed in Japan